Benjy is a 1951 American short documentary film directed by Fred Zinnemann. It won an Oscar in 1952 for Documentary Short Subject.

Production
Henry Fonda narrates this short film about a boy who was handicapped from birth. An orthopedic pediatrician wants to provide a therapeutic regimen that could cure the child, a scoliosis patient, but first he needs to convince the boy's parents, who have rejected the child because of his disabilities.

Zinnemann and the film's production crew worked gratis on this project, which was originally designed to be used as a fundraiser for the Los Angeles Orthopaedic Hospital.

In his 1992 book An Autobiography, Zinneman noted that Paramount Pictures arranged for the crew on this production, and that the union members connected to the production turned their salaries back to the hospital. Henry Fonda also volunteered his services for the film.

Although the film extensively used dramatized sequences to tell its story, it was successfully entered in the Academy Award category for Best Documentary Short Subject.

Cast
 Lee Aaker as Benjy
 Henry Fonda as Narrator (voice)

References

External links

1951 films
1951 documentary films
1951 short films
American black-and-white films
American short documentary films
Films directed by Fred Zinnemann
Best Documentary Short Subject Academy Award winners
1950s short documentary films
Sponsored films
Documentary films about children with disability
1950s English-language films
1950s American films